Graham Annesley (born 26 May 1957) is an Australian former politician. He was a member of the New South Wales Legislative Assembly representing Miranda for the Liberal Party from 2011 to 2013. From 3 April 2011 to 28 August 2013 he was the Minister for Sport and Recreation in the O'Farrell government.

Annesley was formerly chief executive officer of the Gold Coast Titans, chief operating officer of the National Rugby League (NRL) and a leading rugby league referee. He is currently the head of elite football operations for the NRL

Rugby league
Annesley commenced his rugby league career with the Parramatta District Rugby League Referees Association. Starting as a 13-year-old referee, Annesley also undertook later administrative roles in the Association, including Secretary (1979–1980) and President (1985–1988). He was elected as a Life Member of the Association in 1984.

Rising through the refereeing ranks, Annesley became a first grade referee in 1982. Between 1982 and 1997 he controlled 244 first-grade matches and six finals matches. He is ranked number 12 in the list of all-time first grade matches refereed.

Annesley's notable representative appointments include the 1994 State of Origin and test matches between Great Britain and Australia, also in 1994.

Annesley's business career included appointments with DHL, McWilliams Wines, Totalisator Agency Board (TAB) and the Roads & Traffic Authority. He became a full-time sports administrator in 1995 as director of football for the NRL, promoted to chief operating officer in 2002.

Annesley is credited with introducing the video referee system in 1996.

Since 2019, Annesley has been the NRL head of elite football operations.

Away from rugby league, Annesley is an Australia Day ambassador for Liverpool Shire Council.

Politics
Pre-selected by the Liberal Party to contest Miranda at the 2007 state election, Annesley was defeated by the sitting Labor member Barry Collier by a margin of 603 votes. He again contested the seat at the March 2011 elections and was elected, receiving a swing of 21.8% in the traditionally Liberal seat, winning 71.0% of the vote on a two-party preferred basis. As Collier retired at the election, Annesley's main competitor was Therese Cook, representing Labor.

Annesley was subsequently appointed Minister for Sport and Recreation in the O'Farrell–Stoner coalition government. On 28 August 2013 he announced his resignation as Minister for Sport and Recreation
and his intention to resign from Parliament to become CEO of the Gold Coast Titans, triggering a 2013 Miranda by-election on 19 October. In his resignation speech to parliament, Annesley said he never regarded himself as a politician and that there were many aspects of politics he did not care for. He said that he had always felt more at home as a sports administrator.

In October 2013, Annesley said that he arranged for Telstra to put in mobile reception, six months prior and without charge, for a new property at Yowie Bay he bought with his wife, claiming he couldn't do his job as a minister otherwise.

References

External links
Graham Annesley, MP – Liberal Party.

Maiden Speech – Parliament of New South Wales.
 

1957 births
Living people
Australian rugby league referees
Australian rugby league administrators
Gold Coast Titans
Liberal Party of Australia members of the Parliament of New South Wales
Members of the New South Wales Legislative Assembly
21st-century Australian politicians
National Rugby League referees